Charles Reed may refer to:

Charles Reed (architect) (1814–1859), (also known as Charles Verelst), English architect
Charles Reed (British politician) (1819–1881), British politician; Member of Parliament for Hackney and St Ives
Charles Manning Reed (1803–1871), U.S. Representative from Pennsylvania
Charles B. Reed (1941–2016), chancellor of the California State University system
Charles W. Reed (1842–1926), Medal of Honor recipient in the American Civil War
Charles Reed (cricketer), English professional cricketer 
Charles Reed (footballer) (1885 – after 1910), English professional footballer
Charles A. Reed (architect) (1858–1911), co-founder of Reed and Stem, an architecture firm based in St. Paul, Minnesota
Charles A. Reed (fireboat), the City of Toronto's first official fireboat
Charles A. Reed (New Jersey politician) (1857–1940), New Jersey state senator
Chuck Reed (Charles Rufus Reed, born 1948), mayor of San Jose, California
Chick Reed (Charles William Reed, 1912–1964), English footballer active in the 1930s
C. A. L. Reed (Charles Alfred L. Reed) American medical doctor

See also 
Charlie Reed (disambiguation)
Charles Reid (disambiguation)
Charles Read (disambiguation)
Charles Reade (disambiguation)